This is a list of notable alleged sightings of unidentified flying objects (UFOs) in the United Kingdom. Many more sightings have become known since the gradual release, between 2008 and 2013, of the Ministry of Defence's UFO sighting reports by the National Archives. In recent years, there have been many sightings of groups of slowly moving lights in the night sky, which can be easily explained as Chinese lanterns. Undertaken between 1997 and 2000, Project Condign concluded that all the investigated sightings of unidentified aerial phenomena in the UK could be attributed to misidentified but explicable objects, or poorly understood natural phenomena.

12th century
 1113: Religious pilgrims in South West England reported seeing a glowing fire-belching "dragon" emerge from the sea, flying into the air, and disappearing into the sky.

13th century
 January 1254: In St. Albans, England, a scribe wrote of a glowing floating light, thus recorded it, "...in serene sky and clear air, with stars shining and the Moon eight days old, there suddenly appeared in the sky a kind of large ship elegantly shaped, well equipped and of marvellous colour."
1290: Friars of Byland Abbey, described of "a flat, round shining silvery object" flying overhead of them. However, this report is a hoax perpetrated by two teenagers in the 1950s.

20th century

1940s
 February 1942: A woman named Eileen Arnold was walking down Cheltenham High Street when she suddenly experienced an altered state of consciousness as she became "tuned into another reality". She became aware of a large oval shape moving slowly above the rooftops. She stated that it radiated light from holes in its side and had quills which detached one by one, also emitting light. Following the encounter, Eileen believed she had numerous psychic experiences.
 September 1942: Albert Lancaster believed he was abducted by aliens while working as a guard at a radar site near Newbiggin-by-the-Sea, Northumberland. He claimed to have a sudden urge to go outside, followed by a "strange impulse to look at the sky." He claims he saw a glowing light surrounded by dark mist and, assuming it to be a German weapon, went to raise the alarm before being struck by a beam of light from the cloud, followed by a floating sensation, then becoming aware he was back at his post. After this experience, he believed he had psychic powers for a period of time.
 5 August 1944: According to records released on 5 August 2010, British wartime PM Winston Churchill banned the reporting, for fifty years, of an alleged UFO incident because of fears it could create mass panic. Reports given to Churchill claimed the incident involved a Royal Air Force (RAF) reconnaissance plane returning from a mission in France or Germany. Allegedly, when flying over or near the English coastline, the aircraft was suddenly intercepted by a strange metallic object that matched its course and speed for a time before accelerating away and disappearing. The plane's crew were reported to have photographed the object, which they said had "hovered noiselessly" near the aircraft, before moving off. According to the documents, details of the cover-up emerged when a man wrote to the government in 1999 seeking to find out more about the incident. He described how his grandfather, who served with the RAF in the Second World War, was present when Churchill and U.S. General Dwight Eisenhower discussed how to deal with the UFO encounter. The files come from more than 5,000 pages of UFO reports, letters, and drawings from members of the public, as well as questions raised by Members of the UK Parliament. They are available to download for free for a month from The National Archives website.

1950s
 1 June 1950: A Gloster Meteor at RAF Tangmere passes a flying saucer lit up with lights, described as "Britain's first flying saucer". The object was reported to be "shining, revolving, and disc-like" at 20,000 ft at 14:30, flying eastwards over the Portsmouth area. RAF Tangmere asked the radar station at RAF Wartling in Sussex if it had seen the object, and it had on its PPI screen. It led to the setting up of the Flying Saucer Working Party.
 14 August 1950: A 50 ft-diameter disc UFO is seen over the Royal Aircraft Establishment (RAE) at 11:27 by an experienced pilot F/Lt Hubbard. He claimed to see another similar object on 5 September 1950 at 16:09.
 26 August 1950: In the early hours of the morning a 20-year-old woman was walking back to her home in the village of Stanton Drew, Somerset from a party when she decided to take a shortcut through a field near to the stone circles where upon she heard a buzzing sound, she turned to her left and noticed a bright saucer-shaped object hovering over the next field. A door on the craft began to open and she screamed, started to run and did not stop until she got home.
 14–25 September 1952: Operation Mainbrace. On 19 September at 10:53, a silver disc-shaped object followed a Gloster Meteor returning to RAF Topcliffe and was seen by observers on the ground. It rotated whilst hovering. It then travelled towards the west at high speed. On 21 September, six RAF planes followed a spherical object over the North Sea. It followed one of the planes back to the base. It was the front-page headline on 20 September 1952 on the Yorkshire Evening Press and on 21 September 1952 on the Sunday Dispatch., and was reported by 31-year-old Shackleton pilot Flt Lt John Kilburn of 269 Squadron, from Thornhill, Cumberland
 21 October 1952: Two RAF pilots in a Gloster Meteor saw three disc-shaped objects at 35,000 ft in the Little Rissington UFO incident.
 9 October 1953: Two BEA pilots flying from London to Paris see a saucer object over the English Channel for thirty minutes in a Airspeed Ambassador (Elizabethan); former RAF pilot Captain Peter Fletcher, of Putney, had taken off at 09:00 from London Airport
 3 November 1953: Terry Johnson and Geoffrey Smythe in an RAF de Havilland Vampire saw a UFO over RAF West Malling.
 29 June 1954: A BOAC pilot in a Boeing 377 Stratocruiser sees seven UFOs when travelling back from New York to London over the North Atlantic; in G-ALSC Boeing 377-10-28 (sold to Transocean Air Lines in January 1959) RMA Centaurus; the aircraft left New York Idlewild Airport at 17:03 on Flight 510-196 heading for refuelling at CFB Goose Bay, where the pilot saw seven UFOs four hours later near Newfoundland for eighteen minutes at 19,000 ft from 01:05 GMT to 01:23 GMT; Captain James Howard, aged 33 from Bristol, was a former RAF Bomber Command Squadron Leader on his 265th crossing of the Atlantic, and he was interviewed on 3 July 1954 for the BBC In Town Tonight with air hostess 28-year-old Daphne Webster of Hounslow, and First Officer Lee Boyd, the co-pilot, who flew in the Pathfinder Force in World War II
 14 October 1954: F/Lt James Salandin of the Royal Auxiliary Air Force, flying in a No. 604 Squadron RAF Gloster Meteor F8 from RAF North Weald, narrowly missed two UFOs over Southend-on-Sea at around 16:30 at 16,000 ft. The objects were circular with one being coloured silver and the other gold. He narrowly avoided having a head-on collision with the silver object.
 17 July 1955 at noon: on King Harold's Way in Bexleyheath in the London Borough of Bexley a 30-foot-wide saucer-shaped object was seen to hover a few feet above a street in broad daylight by Margaret Fry and her doctor on a very hot cloudless day. Car engines nearby to the object stalled. It was seen by around thirty people and made a humming noise and landed at the junction of Ashbourne Road and Whitfield Road. It hovered over Bedonwell Primary School (now Bedonwell Junior School) for around one minute. It finally shot off into the sky. Another UFO had landed a few streets away at the same time. A similar object had been seen in Bexleyheath in 1952.
 13 August 1956: Lakenheath-Bentwaters incident – 12 to 15 objects were picked up by USAF radar over East Anglia at 12:00. One object was tracked at more than 4,000 mph by USAF GCA radar at RAF Bentwaters. The objects sometimes travelled in formation, then converged to form a larger object and performed sharp turns. One object was tracked for 26 miles (41.8 kilometres) which then hovered for five minutes then flew off. One object at 22:00 was tracked at 12,000 mph. RAF de Havilland Venoms from RAF Waterbeach had sightings of the objects.
 22 September 1956: a large, spherical glass-like 80-foot-diameter object was seen over the Cleethorpes coast for over an hour and also seen on radar from RAF Manby at 15:00. RAF planes approached the object and it flew off.

 4 April 1957: West Freugh incident – a large object was seen on radar at RAF West Freugh near Stranraer at 50,000 ft which was stationary for 10 minutes over the Irish Sea. It moved vertically to 70,000 ft and was also tracked by radar at Ardwell. The object made an "impossible" sharp turn and was described as being as large as a ship, bigger than a normal aircraft.
 20 May 1957: Milton Torres 1957 UFO Encounter – a USAF F-86D Sabre based at RAF Manston intercepted an object over East Anglia.

1960s
 From late spring (19 May) to early summer 1965: Many sightings of UFOs were seen in the Warminster area. Cley Hill, near to the town, has since been a place for frequent sightings.

 28 April 1967: For approximately one hour around 12:00, a dome-shaped object was sighted at about 1,600 ft over Brixham in Devon. A door was seen in the side of the object and it had been spotted by the HM Coastguard station at Berry Head. There were 362 UFO sightings in 1967; there had only been 95 in 1966.
 1967: Clapham Wood in West Sussex experienced a rash of UFO sightings and unexplained events during the 1960s and continuing into the 1970s.
 24 October 1967: "Devon Flying Cross UFO" – At 4:00, PCs Roger Willey and Clifford Waycott were driving from Holsworthy to Hatherleigh along the A3072. They saw a bright object in the shape of a cross at tree-top height about 40 metres away. They followed the "pulsating" object for about fifteen minutes along the road at speeds of up to 80 mph. The object was described as being star-spangled like "looking through wet glass". It was joined by a second object at 4:23. A motorist, Mr Christopher Garner of Hatherleigh, had also seen it and thought he was having a nightmare. The object disappeared at around 5:00, having been pursued for fourteen miles. It was attributed to the planet Venus, as were other similar sightings that same month.
 25 October 1967: "Sussex Flying Cross" – Policemen in five police cars across East Sussex reported a bright flying cross in the early hours, with the first sighting at 4:45 at Halland. The other sightings were a few minutes later, and also seen in Wales.
 26 October 1967: 54-year-old Mr Angus Brooks, a former BOAC administrator from Owermoigne in Dorset, was walking at 11:25 on Moigns Down near Holworth, close to the Dorset coast with his two dogs in a force 8 gale and took shelter in a hollow. He then saw a circular translucent craft with a "girder" at the front and three pointing to the rear. The "girders" rearranged to form a cross shape around the central 25 ft-diameter disc and then began to spin. Twenty-two minutes later, the "girders" returned to their original position and the craft sped off in a northeast direction.

1970s
 8 September 1970: Captain William Schaffner intercepted an unknown object over the North Sea. His BAC Lightning aircraft was later retrieved from the sea.
 1971: It is claimed that unidentified silent craft were regularly seen by two school children near the coastal village of Muchalls, Scotland, (but not in the village itself) from 1971 onwards. These events are alleged to have reoccurred night after night for many years, and are reputed to have continued until at least 1991 when some aspects of the apparitions were also filmed in the area.

 16 October 1973: It is alleged that Gabriella Versacci was taken on board an alien space ship near a small village in Somerset, England. She was physically inspected after being strapped to an examination table.
 23 January 1974: A UFO allegedly crashed on the Berwyn Mountains in Wales. The event coincided with an earthquake.
 June 1976: An official British Airways film taken during one of Concorde's flights over southern England depicts a white light moving around the fuselage of the aircraft. A later analysis of the film, presented in a UFO documentary, indicated that the light was an artifact of the video camera.
 4 February 1977: A cigar-shaped craft is alleged to have landed next to Broad Haven Primary School and witnessed by 14 school children who saw a silver creature. The headteacher Ralph Llewellyn interviewed fifteen children on Monday 7 February 1977, who all make similar drawings
 Wednesday 16 February 1977: at Rhosybol in Anlesey in north Wales, nine children at the primary school see a mysterious object, and make similar drawings
 22 November 1978: At 17:15, Elsie Oakensen of Church Stowe, Northamptonshire, was driving southwards down the A5 from Weedon Bec towards her home. She saw two bright lights, one green and one red, and could make out a dumbbell-shaped object. Turning off the A5 to her village, her recently serviced car cut out twice. She then noticed the sky was black and a brilliant white beam of light was shining on the road ahead, then the sky returned to its normal colour. After the experience, Elsie could not account for 15 minutes of her time.
 9 November 1979: Bob Taylor, a forestry worker, had an alleged encounter with a UFO in a clearing on Dechmont Law in Livingston, West Lothian. He claimed that the UFO had dragged him along the ground. This is considered to be one of the most significant close encounters in Scotland.

1980s
 29 November 1980 at 5:00: police officer Alan Godfrey claims to have been abducted by an alien space craft in Todmorden in West Yorkshire. A strange luminescent object had been spotted by other local police officers at the same time.
 December 1980: A series of reported sightings of unexplained lights and objects in the sky, and the alleged landing of an extraterrestrial spacecraft occurred at Rendlesham Forest, Suffolk, England on 26 December. It is perhaps the most famous UFO event to have happened in Britain, ranking amongst the best-known UFO events worldwide.
 12 August 1983: 77-year-old Alfred Burtoo was quietly fishing on the Basingstoke Canal when a UFO landed nearby. Two humanoid beings beckoned him onto their disc-shaped vehicle and he was medically examined by English-speaking creatures. He was "rejected" by the creatures because he was "too old".
 26 April 1984: Several people reported a UFO over Stanmore in north-west London, and was seen by two police officers.
 13 October 1984: Several people see a flying saucer over Waterloo Bridge in London.
 19 November 1987 at 19:00: a large UFO was seen at close quarters hovering over houses in Brierley Hill.

 1 December 1987: Philip Spencer (pseudonym), a retired policeman, took a picture on Ilkley Moor, which is claimed to be of an alien creature, and then saw a white-coloured craft leaving the area. The object in the photograph was examined by Kodak Laboratories at Hemel Hempstead and they decided that the object was not superimposed. This was one of the few British close encounters of the third kind. Under hypnosis he claimed to have been abducted and medically examined.

1990s–2000
 4 August 1990 at around 21:00: a diamond object estimated to be 100 feet wide was seen and photographed by two men near Calvine, Perth and Kinross, Scotland. It was reported as hovering silently in place for 10 minutes before rising rapidly into the sky.
 21 April 1991: airline pilot Achille Zaghetti from Grosseto, Tuscany, in an Alitalia McDonnell Douglas MD-80 on a flight from Milan to Heathrow saw a three-metre-long khaki-coloured object over Lydd in Kent at 22,000 ft about 300m away. It was seen on radar.
 1992: James Walker noticed unidentified lights in the sky over Bonnybridge, the town became the scene of numerous UFO sightings. It forms part of the "Falkirk Triangle", an area stretching from Stirling to Fife and the outskirts of Edinburgh. Ufologists claim that Bonnybridge is the world's number one UFO location, with an average of around 300 sightings a year.
 March 1992: Isabella Sloggett, and her daughter Carol, were walking towards Bonnybridge and saw a blue light hovering above the road in front of them. A UFO landed, and a door on the craft opened.

 1993, 31 March: Multiple witnesses across south-west and west England saw a large triangular-shaped UFO speeding across the sky leaving a luminous wake. Analysis of the sightings concluded that the object was the re-entry of a Russian booster rocket combined with a later sighting of a police helicopter.
 26 September 1993: a large black triangle is seen over Bakewell in the Derbyshire Dales at 21:30.
 19 February 1994: a metallic disc-shaped object was filmed over Craigluscar Reservoir near Dunfermline in Scotland by Ian McPherson.
 6 January 1995: pilots aboard a Boeing 737 on British Airways Flight BA5061 from Milan saw an object on their descent to Manchester at 4,000 ft when over the southern Pennines. The reports have been attributed to a bright fireball.
 5 October 1996: the Wash Incident – in the early morning, a rotating UFO was seen over The Wash by Skegness and Boston police officers, although later (partially) explained as a radar echo of St Botolph's Church. The visual sightings were explained as celestial objects.
 24 March 1997: At 22:00 on the Dark Peak, Howden Moor, two sonic booms were heard over the area, and recorded at this time although the RAF denied having supersonic aircraft in the area. They later helped in the night-long search for a crashed aircraft, using helicopters and sniffer dogs from the police with 150 Mountain Rescue volunteers. No wreckage was found. A triangle-shaped UFO had been seen an hour before the sonic booms in the local area.
 5 October 2000: A woman named Sharon Rowlands from Bonsall, Derbyshire claimed to have seen a large luminous pink object hovering and rotating over a nearby field. She filmed the object on a camcorder.

21st century

 26 May 2004: a 60 metre long cigar-shaped object was seen over Torquay. Local teenagers later came forward to admit the sighting was caused by their toy inflatable airship.
 June 2005: three white objects were seen flying above the east end of Glasgow on a cloudy sky around 00:00. A man from Baillieston was reported to have heard spaceman-esque voices through his electronic equipment around the time of the sighting. Russian Antonov An-30s were proposed as explanations. A similar sighting was seen in Lockeridge, Wiltshire on broad daylight. A man reported seeing three "white metallic craft" while out cycling on the evening of 21 June.
 June, 2006: Cookley Worcestershire sighting of a shiny silver silent triangle shaped object in the evening sky. Whilst travelling along Lea Lane heading to village of Cookley. 2 people in a car saw the object whilst heading home. The object was hovering approximately 5–10 meters above the floor completely silent and moving along horizon.
 November, 2007: Numerous people from the West Midlands conurbation reported sightings of a silent triangle shaped object in the skies in the evening which the press dubbed the "Dudley Dorito".
 12 January 2008: A large fleet of UFOs or "glowing Red Spheres" were seen over Liverpool heading east.
 8 June 2008: A number of UFO sightings took place in Wales which involved a police helicopter following a UFO over Cardiff near MOD St Athan, the Bristol Channel and nearby areas such as Eglwys Brewis, Barry, and Sully.
 26 June 2009: British singer Kim Wilde reported having seen a "huge bright light behind a cloud" above her Hertfordshire garden. She described the light as "brighter than the moon, but similar to the light from the moon". Upon further inspection, Wilde reported to have witnessed the light moving "very quickly, from about 11:00 to 1:00. Then it just did that, back and forth, for several minutes… Whenever it moved, something shifted in the air – but it was silent. Absolutely silent." A second report of this UFO was subsequently made by a fellow local Hertfordshire resident, who had managed to obtain photographic evidence to support the apparent sighting.
 10 September 2009: In Glen Road, near Lennoxtown, three people in a car were reportedly struck by a colourful beam of light, the event reportedly lasted for over two minutes.
 13 July 2013: An Airbus A320 pilot encounters an object closing in on his passenger plane, which passes extremely close to the cockpit whilst flying at 34,000 ft above Berkshire. With no time to make an evasive manoeuvre, the Captain instinctively ducked as he believed a collision was imminent.

See also
 British UFO Research Association
 List of UFO sightings
 List of investigations of UFOs by governments
 UFO sightings in Australia

References

External links 
 National Archives
 MUFON - Last 20 UFO Sightings and Pictures
 PRUFOS
 Interview with Robert Taylor and detectives investigating the case on YouTube. as shown on the 10th episode of Arthur C. Clarke's Mysterious World, originally broadcast 4 November 1980
 Ufo sightings from stirling city Scotland 1985 to 2017

 
Historical events in the United Kingdom
British history timelines
The National Archives (United Kingdom)